Miandeh (also Romanized as Mīāndeh and Meyāndeh; also known as Miandy) is a village in Kasma Rural District, in the Central District of Sowme'eh Sara County, Gilan Province, Iran. At the 2006 census, its population was 567, in 171 families.

References 

Populated places in Sowme'eh Sara County